Janina Skowronska (February 8, 1920 - 1992) was a Polish composer who is best remembered for her arrangements of folk songs, and for creating Little Chopin, a children’s musical based on the life and works of Frederic Chopin.

Skowronska was born to a Polish family in Germakowka (then in the USSR, now in Ukraine). She studied music at the State Music College  in Wroclaw, Poland, and with Tadeusz Szeligowski. She received a diploma in 1961.  

Skowronska’s compositions included:

Chamber 

Theme and Variations (string quartet)

Orchestra 

Symphony

Piano 

Preludes

Rondo

Waltz

Theatre 

Little Chopin (for children)

Vocal 

Children’s Songs 

Drugi Brzeg (soprano, oboe, two clarinets and horn) 

“Golden Rain” 

Moda Pani Czepca Nie Ma (mixed chorus) 

O Wy Corne Kawki (folk song; mixed chorus) 

Od Krakowa do Wroclawia (folk dance suite; chorus and orchestra) 

Parodie (text by W. Marianowicz; baritone, soprano, bassoon and string orchestra) 

Pokoju Czas (text by R. Heniszowa; mixed chorus) 

Samotne Drzewa (text by L. Turkowski; mixed chorus) 

Suite of Folk Dances (text by Andrzej Waligórski; orchestra and chorus) 

“Tu Bedziemy” (text by A. Burcia; voice and piano) 

Two Folksongs (soprano and piano)

U.F.O. (for soprano and eight instruments: clarinet, cello, six percussion) 

Ziemio Moja (mixed chorus)

References 

Polish women composers
String quartet composers
1920 births
1992 deaths